Simon Schwarz (born 10 January 1971 in Vienna) is an Austrian actor. He has appeared in more than seventy films since 1996.

Selected filmography

External links
 

1971 births
Living people
Austrian male film actors
Male actors from Vienna
20th-century Austrian male actors
21st-century Austrian male actors